The second season of the American television drama series Masters of Sex premiered on July 13, 2014, and concluded on September 28, 2014. Showtime broadcast the twelve episode second season on Sundays at 10:00 pm (ET) in the United States. The second season was released on DVD and Blu-ray in region 1 on May 5, 2015.

The series was developed for television by Michelle Ashford and is based on the biography Masters of Sex: The Life and Times of William Masters and Virginia Johnson, the Couple Who Taught America How to Love by Thomas Maier. Masters of Sex tells the story of Dr. William Masters (Michael Sheen) and Virginia Johnson (Lizzy Caplan), two pioneering researchers of human sexuality at Washington University in St. Louis, Missouri. The second season takes place between 1958 and 1961.

Cast

Main
 Michael Sheen as Dr. William Masters (12 episodes)
 Lizzy Caplan as Virginia Johnson (12 episodes)
 Caitlin FitzGerald as Libby Masters (11 episodes)
 Teddy Sears as Dr. Austin Langham (8 episodes)
 Annaleigh Ashford as Betty Dimello (11 episodes)

Recurring

Guests
 René Auberjonois as Georgios Papanikolaou (1 episode)

Production 
Showtime renewed the series for a second season of 12 episodes on October 22, 2013. In March 2014, Showtime announced the season would premiere in July 2014 as opposed to in the fall as the first season did.

Casting 
Annaleigh Ashford, who had a recurring role in the first season as Betty Dimello, was promoted to series regular for season two. Nicholas D'Agosto, who portrays Dr. Ethan Haas does not return as a series regular in season two, however he has a voice-only role in the season premiere. Several new recurring roles were cast for the second season, including Betsy Brandt and Keke Palmer in March 2014, Sarah Silverman in April, René Auberjonois, Christian Borle, and Courtney B. Vance in May, and Erin Cummings in June. Auberjonois and Cummings however, ultimately only appeared in single episodes.

Episodes

Reception

Critical response 
The second season of Masters of Sex has received acclaim from critics. The season has a Metacritic score of 89 out of 100 based on 15 reviews. Alan Sepinwall of HitFix wrote that season 2 is even better than season 1, and that the series "has much more on its mind than simply the tumultuous relationship between its two famous central characters. But if it just had those two, it would still be among the best things you could watch on television this summer." Hank Stuever of The Washington Post wrote "It is intelligent, witty, quick-paced and surprising; it is tragic without being emotionally devastating." Verne Gay of Newsday wrote that season 2 is "Better, richer, more compelling than season one" and the season's third episode, "Fight", is the best episode the series has done to date.

Accolades 
For the 5th Critics' Choice Television Awards, Julianne Nicholson was nominated for Best Guest Performer in a Drama Series. For the 67th Primetime Emmy Awards, Beau Bridges was nominated for Outstanding Guest Actor in a Drama Series and Allison Janney was nominated for Outstanding Guest Actress in a Drama Series.

References

External links
 

2014 American television seasons
Television series set in 1958
Television series set in 1959
Television series set in 1960
Television series set in 1961